Zeitschrift für Physik (English: Journal for Physics) is a defunct series of German peer-reviewed physics journals established in 1920 by Springer Berlin Heidelberg. The series stopped publication in 1997, when it merged with other journals to form the new European Physical Journal series. It had grown to four parts over the years.

History
Zeitschrift für Physik (1920–1975 ), The first three issues were published as a supplement to Verhandlungen der Deutschen Physikalischen Gesellschaft. The journal split in parts A and B in 1975.

Zeitschrift für Physik A (1975–1997). The original subtitle was Atoms and Nuclei. In 1986, it split in Zeitschrift für Physik A: Atomic Nuclei and Zeitschrift für Physik D. Zeitschrift für Physik A now continues as the European Physical Journal A.

Zeitschrift für Physik B (1975–1997). This is the result of the split of Zeitschrift für Physik and the merger of Physics of Condensed Matter. Physics of Condensed Matter was itself the continuation of Physik der Kondensierten Materie ). The original subtitle of Zeitschrift für Physik B was Condensed Matter and Quanta but changed to Condensed Matter in 1980. Zeitschrift für Physik B merged with Journal de Physique I to form European Physical Journal B.

Zeitschrift für Physik C: Particles and Fields (1979–1997), continuing as the European Physical Journal C.

Zeitschrift für Physik D:  Atoms, Molecules and Clusters (1986–1997). Zeitschrift für Physik D merged with Journal de Physique II ( to form European Physical Journal D.

See also
 Physikalische Zeitschrift

External links
Z. Phys. A website
Z. Phys. B website
Z. Phys. C website
Z. Phys. D website

Publications established in 1920
Physics journals
Springer Science+Business Media academic journals
Publications disestablished in 1997
Defunct journals
Academic journal series